Ousmane Seck (28 May 1938 – 28 January 2018) was a Senegalese politician who served as Minister of the Economy and Finance between 1978 and 1983. He died in Dakar, aged 79.

References

1938 births
2018 deaths
Economy ministers of Senegal
Finance ministers of Senegal